Indé is one of the 39 municipalities of Durango, in north-western Mexico. The municipal seat lies at Indé. The municipality covers an area of 2370.9 km².

In 2010, the municipality had a total population of 5,280, up from 4,824 in 2005.

The municipality had 83 localities, none of which had a population over 1,000.

References

Municipalities of Durango
Camino Real de Tierra Adentro